Laisha Wilkins Pérez (born 18 May 1976) is a Mexican actress, talk show hostess and producer.

Biography 
She is the daughter of Federico Wilkins, not to be confused with Federico Wilkins, a Televisa producer, and Susana Pérez. Originally studying the culinary arts, she later joined the Center for Arts Education (CEA) of Televisa to study acting. Her first television appearances were a number of small roles in Otro Rollo with Adal Ramones.

Laisha made her debut in 1997 with the series Mi generacion (My Generation), then eventually went on to appear in a few telenovelas, including Soñadoras, the highly-popular Locura de Amor (Madness of Love), Primer amor... a mil por hora, and Bajo la Misma Piel.  Subsequently, she received an opportunity as host in TeleHit video channel. Also, between 2001 and 2002 she participated in several "Mujer, casos de la vida real" chapters.

Away from acting, Laisha has appeared on several talk shows as a fill-in hostess, most notably on the Miami-based  El Gordo y La Flaca. In 2006, she made a performance in the telenovela La fea más bella. In 2007, she made his first foray into film in the movie "Mejor es que Gabriela no se muera".

On January 1 of 2008, Laisha started hosting a new show on Televisa's Canal 4, titled Metrópolis.  She is set to reprise her role of Lt. Lucia Alvarez in Mujeres Asesinas, but this time she will transform into one of the killers.

That same year Angelli Nesma offered her the role of Constanza in "Un gancho al corazón". Later, she debuted as co-producer and actress of the 2010 Mexican film Ángel caído, playing the role of Perséfone. Laisha also made a comeback in Corazón Salvaje. In 2011 she returned as an antagonist in La fuerza del destino. In 2013 participated in special performance in Mentir para vivir. In 2015, she returned as an antagonist in Que te perdone Dios, where Angelli Nesma Medina offered Laisha the role of twin sisters Ximena / Daniela.

Private life 
She is fluent in English, Spanish, and French.

Filmography

Films

Television

As producer

Awards and nominations

References

External links

1976 births
Living people
Mexican telenovela actresses
Mexican television actresses
Mexican film actresses
Mexican film producers
Mexican television presenters
Mexican television talk show hosts
Actresses from Mexico City
20th-century Mexican actresses
21st-century Mexican actresses
Mexican people of English descent
People from Mexico City
Mexican women television presenters